John Waugh may refer to:

 John S. Waugh (1929–2014), American chemist
 John Waugh (footballer, born 1892) (1892–?), Scottish footballer for Gillingham
 John Waugh (footballer, born 1889) (1889–?), Scottish footballer for Hamilton Academical and Motherwell
 John C. Waugh (born 1929), also known as Jack Waugh, American journalist and historian
 John Waugh (bishop) (1656–1734), English churchman, bishop of Carlisle from 1723
 John Waugh (priest) (died 1765)
 John Waugh, saxophonist with The 1975